Abdel Majid al-Majali Also known as Abu Qutaibah al Majali and Abu Qutayba al-Ordony is a Salafi jihadist from Al Karak who recruited Abu Musab al-Zarqawi to fight in Afghanistan. He was one of participants in the Afghan Arabs، and the manager of Maktab al-Khidamat in Jordan. his older son qutaibah is fighting with Islamic State of Iraq and the Levant and his other son yusef returned from fighting with ISIS. He was arrested in 2014 because of encouraging people to fight with ISIS. Some Jordanian writers claimed that his jihadist activities was linked with 2016 Al-Karak attack.

See also
 Osama bin Laden
 Abdullah Azzam

External links
 meforum.org

References

People from Karak Governorate
Jordanian al-Qaeda members
Salafi jihadists
Living people
Year of birth missing (living people)